Jean Massieu (1772 – July 21, 1846) was a pioneering deaf educator. One of six deaf siblings, he was denied schooling until age thirteen when he met Abbé Sicard, who enrolled him in the Institute national des jeunes sourds de Bordeaux-Gradignan, the Bordeaux School for Deaf Children. There he learned to read and write French, and later helped develop the first formalized French Sign Language. This French Sign Language was later adapted into American Sign Language. He taught at the famous school for the deaf in Paris where Laurent Clerc was one of his students. He began work after a scandal in Paris in Rodez and dedicated his life to educating deaf children. Later he founded a deaf school in Lille, France.

Film
Jean Massieu is portrayed in the fictional film Sign Gene, the superhero film about deaf mutants who have superpowers through the use of sign language, as the fourth great-grandfather of Kate Massieu (played by Carola Insolera) the girlfriend of the leading character Tom Clerc, descendant of Laurent Clerc. The film is written and produced by Emilio Insolera and was screened in cinemas in September 2017.

Quotes attributed to him
 "Let the Englishman have his coffee, and let me have my ham."—Jean Massieu
 "Gratitude is the memory of the heart", which has become a proverb in the French language.

See also
 Ferdinand Berthier
 Roch-Ambroise Auguste Bébian

References

External links
 Massieu, Jean; Laurent Clerc; and Roch Ambroise Cucurron Sicard. 1815. A collection of the most remarkable definitions and answers of Massieu and Clerc, deaf and dumb, to the various questions put to them, at the public lectures of the Abbé Sicard, in London. London: Printed for Massieu and Clerc, by Cox and Baylis, Great Queen Street, Lincoln's-Inn-Fields
 "Jean Massieu," 1849 article written by Laurent Clerc
 Massieu, Jean (Gallaudet University Library web page)
 Date of the death of Jean Massieu, in Journal de Toulouse, 28 July 1846: "Jean Massieu, ancien professeur à l'Institut royal des sourds-muets de Paris, fondateur et directeur honoraire de l'institution des sourds-muets de Lille, est mort dans cette ville le 21 juillet, à l'àge de soixante-quinze ans. M. Massieu avait été l'élève, l'ami et le successeur de l'illustre abbé Sicard."

1772 births
1846 deaths
Deaf activists
French deaf people
Educators of the deaf
French educators
French Sign Language